Panicum hallii, commonly known as Hall's panicgrass, is a perennial bunch grass in the genus Panicum which is native to the south/southwestern regions of the United States, and into southern Mexico.

References

hallii